Ramanathan Krishnan defeated Ashley Cooper in the final, 6–2, 7–5 to win the boys' singles tennis title at the 1954 Wimbledon Championships.

Draw

Finals

Top half

Bottom half

References

External links

Boys' Singles
Wimbledon Championship by year – Boys' singles